Vagner Luis de Oliveira Marins (born November 3, 1980) is a Brazilian footballer that currently plays for Busaiteen Club in the Bahraini Premier League.

References

1980 births
Association football defenders
Brazilian expatriate footballers
Brazilian expatriate sportspeople in Indonesia
Brazilian footballers
Expatriate footballers in Indonesia
Liga 1 (Indonesia) players
Living people
Persiwa Wamena players
PSM Makassar players
Pelita Jaya FC players
PSMS Medan players
Villa Rio Esporte Clube players
Footballers from Rio de Janeiro (city)